Nathan McMillan (born 18 August 1983) is an Australian former professional rugby league footballer who played as a  for the Parramatta Eels in the NRL in 2003.

Playing career
McMillan joined the Parramatta Eels in the 2003 season. He made his lone first grade appearance from the bench in his sides' 36−34 loss to the Manly-Warringah Sea Eagles at Brookvale Oval in round 10 of the 2003 season. He was released by the club at the end of the 2003 season and subsequently never played first grade rugby league again.

References

1983 births
Living people
Australian rugby league players
Parramatta Eels players
Rugby league props
Rugby league players from Sydney